Breznica is a village located in the municipality of Bujanovac, Serbia. According to the 2002 census, the town has a population of 1,362 people. Of these, 1334 (97,94 %) were ethnic Albanians, 1 (0,07 %) Serb, and 11 (0,80 %) others.

References

Populated places in Pčinja District
Albanian communities in Serbia